Indeni is a Zambian football club based in Ndola that plays in the MTN/FAZ Super Division.

Stadium
They play their home games at Indeni Sports Complex in Ndola.

League participation
Zambian Premier League: 2011–2012, 2013Zambian Second Division: 2012–2013

References

External links
 Soccerway

Football clubs in Zambia
Ndola